is a passenger railway station located in the city of Sagamihara, Kanagawa Prefecture, Japan, operated by the East Japan Railway Company (JR East).

Lines

Station layout
The station consists of a single island platform connected to a modern station building by a footbridge. The station is attended.

Platforms

History
Harataima Station was opened on April 29, 1931 as a station on the Sagami Railway. On June 1, 1944, the Sagami Railway was nationalized and merged with the Japan National Railways. Freight services were discontinued from October 1962. On April 1, 1987, with the dissolution and privatization of the Japan National Railways, the station came under the operation of JR East. The station building was complexly rebuilt in 1991. Automated turnstiles using the Suica IC card system came into operation from November 2001.

Passenger statistics
In fiscal 2019, the station was used by an average of 5,176 passengers daily (boarding passengers only).

The passenger figures (boarding passengers only) for previous years are as shown below.

Surrounding area
Muryoko-ji, Buddhist temple, one of the 50 scenic spots in Kanagawa 
Kanshin-ji, Buddhist temple, Buso Kannon Pilgrimage Route #31

See also
List of railway stations in Japan

References

External links

Station information page 

Railway stations in Kanagawa Prefecture
Railway stations in Japan opened in 1931
Railway stations in Sagamihara
Sagami Line